The 21st Legislative Assembly of Saskatchewan was elected in the Saskatchewan general election held in October 1986. The assembly sat from December 3, 1986, to September 2, 1991. The Progressive Conservative Party led by Grant Devine formed the government. The New Democratic Party (NDP) led by Allan Blakeney formed the official opposition. After Blakeney resigned in 1987, Roy Romanow became NDP leader.

Arnold Tusa served as speaker for the assembly.

Members of the Assembly 
The following members were elected to the assembly in 1986:

Notes:

Party Standings 

Notes:

By-elections 
By-elections were held to replace members for various reasons:

Notes:

References 

Terms of the Saskatchewan Legislature